Rong Guiqing (born May 1958) is a lieutenant general (zhongjiang) in the Chinese People's Liberation Army. He has been Deputy Commander of the PLA Ground Force since December 2015, and previously served as Chief of Staff of the Chengdu Military Region and Commander of the 54th Group Army.

Biography
Rong was born in Weishi County, Henan Province. He is a graduate of the PLA National Defence University. He is a member of the Communist Party of China.

In July 2008, he was promoted to the rank of major general. In 2009 he became Commander of the 54th Group Army of the Jinan Military Region, a position he held until December 2014, when he was transferred to the Chengdu Military Region and served as Chief of Staff, replacing Zhou Xiaozhou. In December 2015, he was promoted again to become Deputy Commander of the People's Liberation Army Ground Force. In January 2016, he was appointed deputy commander and chief of staff of the newly established Western Theater Command. He was promoted to lieutenant general (zhongjiang) in July 2016.

He was a delegate to the 12th National People's Congress.

References

1958 births
People from Weishi County
Living people
PLA National Defence University alumni
People's Liberation Army generals from Henan
Chiefs of Staff of the Chengdu Military Region
Delegates to the 12th National People's Congress